The Wind in the Willows is a children's novel by the Scottish novelist Kenneth Grahame, first published in 1908. It details the story of Mole, Ratty, and Badger as they try to help Mr. Toad, after he becomes obsessed with motorcars and gets into trouble. It also details short stories about them that are disconnected from the main narrative. The novel was based on bedtime stories Grahame told his son Alastair. It has been adapted numerous times for both stage and screen.

The Wind in the Willows received negative reviews upon its initial release, but it has since become a classic of British literature. It was listed at No. 16 in the BBC's survey The Big Read and has been adapted multiple times in different media.

Background

Kenneth Grahame married Elspeth Thomson, the daughter of Robert William Thomson in 1899, when he was 40. The next year they had their only child, a boy named Alastair (nicknamed "Mouse"). He was born premature, blind in one eye, and was plagued by health problems throughout his life. When Alastair was about four years old, Grahame would tell him bedtime stories, some of which were about a toad, and on his frequent boating holidays without his family he would write further tales of Toad, Mole, Ratty and Badger in letters to Alastair.

In 1908, Grahame took early retirement from his position as secretary of the Bank of England. He moved with his wife and son to an old farmhouse in Blewbury, Berkshire. There, he used the bedtime stories he had told Alastair as a basis for the manuscript of The Wind in the Willows.

Plot summary
With the arrival of spring and fine weather outside, the good-natured Mole loses patience with spring cleaning. He has fled his underground home and ends up at the river, which he has never seen before. Here he meets Rat, a water vole, who takes Mole for a ride in his rowing boat. They get along well and spend many more days boating, with “Ratty” teaching Mole the ways of the river, with the two friends living together in Ratty's riverside home.

One summer day, Rat and Mole disembark near the grand Toad Hall and pay a visit to Toad. Toad is rich, jovial, friendly and kindhearted, but arrogant and rash; he regularly becomes obsessed with current fads, only to abandon them abruptly. His current craze is his horse-drawn caravan. When a passing car scares his horse and causes the caravan to overturn into a ditch, Toad's craze for caravan travel is immediately replaced by an obsession with motorcars.

On a snowy winter's day, Mole goes to the Wild Wood, hoping to meet the elusive but virtuous and wise Badger. He gets lost in the woods, succumbs to fright, and hides among the sheltering roots of a tree. Rat finds him as snow begins to fall in earnest. Attempting to find their way home, Mole barks his shin on the boot scraper on Badger's doorscraper. Badger welcomes Rat and Mole to his large and cozy underground home, providing them with hot food, dry clothes, and reassuring conversation. Badger learns from his visitors that Toad has crashed seven cars, has been in the hospital three times, and has spent a fortune on fines. They resolve that when the time is right they will make a plan to protect Toad from himself.

With the arrival of spring, the three of them put Toad under house arrest with themselves as the guards, but Toad pretends to be sick and tricks Ratty to leave so he can escape. Badger and Mole continue to live in Toad Hall in the hope that Toad may return. Toad orders lunch at The Red Lion Inn and then sees a motorcar pull into the courtyard. Taking the car, he drives it recklessly, is caught by the police, and is sent to prison for 20 years.

In prison, Toad gains the sympathy of the gaoler's daughter, who helps him to escape disguised as a washerwoman. After a long series of misadventures, he returns to the hole of the Water Rat. Rat hauls Toad inside and informs him that Toad Hall has been taken over by weasels, stoats, and ferrets from the Wild Wood, who have driven out Mole and Badger. Armed to the teeth, Badger, Rat, Mole and Toad enter through the tunnel and pounce upon the unsuspecting Wild-Wooders who are holding a celebratory party. Having driven away the intruders, Toad holds a banquet to mark his return, during which he behaves both quietly and humbly. He makes up for his earlier excesses by seeking out and compensating those he has wronged, and the four friends live happily ever after.

In addition to the main narrative, the book contains several independent short stories featuring Rat and Mole such as an encounter with the wild god Pan while searching for Otter's son Portly, and Ratty's meeting with a Sea Rat. These appear for the most part between the chapters chronicling Toad's adventures, and they are often omitted from abridgements and dramatisations.

Main characters
Mole: known as "Moley" to his friends. An independent, timid, genial, thoughtful, home-loving animal, and the first character introduced in the story. Discontent with spring cleaning in his secluded home, he ventures into the outside world. Initially intimidated by the hectic lifestyle of the riverbank, he eventually adapts with the support of his new friend Rat. He has a spontaneous intelligence moment with his trickery against the Wild Wooders before the battle to retake Toad Hall.
Rat: known as "Ratty" to his friends (though actually a water vole), he is astute, charming and affable. He enjoys a life of leisure; when not spending time on the river, he composes doggerel. Ratty loves the river and befriends Mole. He can be very unsettled about subjects and endeavours outside his preferred routine, but is persistently loyal and does the right thing when needed, such as when he risks his life to save Mole in the Wild Wood, and helps rid Toad Hall of the unruly weasels. Ratty is the free and easy sort, as well as a dreamer, and he has a poetic thought process, finding deeper meaning, beauty, and intensity in situations others may see through more practical eyes.
Mr. Toad: known as "Toady" to his friends, the wealthy scion of Toad Hall who inherited his wealth from his late father. Although gregarious and well-meaning, as a fixated control freak, he is inclined to boast lavishly and make outrageous outbursts when held back by another character, regardless of their intentions with him. He is prone to obsessions (such as punting, houseboats, and horse-drawn caravans), but gets dissatisfied with each of these activities and drops them fairly quickly, finally settling on motorcars. His motoring craze degenerates into a sort of addiction that lands him in the hospital a few times, subjects him to expensive fines for his unlawfully erratic driving, and eventually gets him imprisoned for theft, dangerous-driving, and severe impertinence to the police. Two chapters of the book chronicle his daring escape from prison.
Mr. Badger: a firm but considerate animal, Badger embodies the "wise hermit" figure. A friend of Toad's deceased father, he is strict with the immature Toad, yet hopes that his good qualities will prevail through his shortcomings. He lives in a vast underground sett, part of which incorporates the remains of a buried Roman settlement. A fearless and powerful fighter, Badger helps clear the Wild-Wooders from Toad Hall with his large stick.

Supporting characters
 Otter and Portly: a good friend of Ratty with a stereotypical "Cockney costermonger" character, Otter is confident, respected and head-strong. Portly is his young son.
 The weasels, ferrets, and stoats: the story's main antagonists. They plot to take over Toad Hall. Although they are unnamed, the leader is referred to as "Chief Weasel".
 Pan: a gentle and wise god of the wild who makes a single, anomalous appearance in Chapter 7, "The Piper at the Gates of Dawn", when he helps Portly and looks after him until Ratty and Mole find him.
 The Gaoler's Daughter: the only major human character, she embodies the youth perspective toward the situation faced by Toad whilst he is incarcerated in prison; a "good, kind, clever girl", she helps Toad escape.
 The Wayfarer: a vagabond seafaring rat, who also makes a single appearance in Chapter 9, "Wayfarers All". Ratty briefly contemplates accompanying him on his adventures, before Mole convinces him otherwise.
 Squirrels and rabbits, who are generally good-natured (although rabbits are described as "a mixed lot").
 Inhabitants of the Wild Wood: weasels, stoats and foxes who are described by Ratty as "All-right in a way but well, you can't really trust them".
 The Barge Woman: An unnamed woman who owns a barge. She offers Toad a ride. Upon realising that he is actually a toad, she throws him off the barge. Toad then steals her barge horse.

Editions

The original publication of the book was plain text, with a frontispiece illustrated by Graham Robertson, but many illustrated, comic, and annotated versions have been published over the years. Notable illustrators include Paul Bransom (1913), Nancy Barnhart (1922), Wyndham Payne (1927), Ernest H. Shepard (1931), Arthur Rackham (1940), Richard Cuffari (1966), Tasha Tudor (1966), Michael Hague (1980), Scott McKowen (2005), and Robert Ingpen (2007).

 The most popular illustrations are probably by E. H. Shepard, originally published in 1931, and believed to be authorised as Grahame was pleased with the initial sketches, though he did not live to see the completed work.
 The Wind in the Willows was the last work illustrated by Arthur Rackham. The book with his illustrations was issued posthumously in a limited edition by the Folio Society with 16 colour plates in 1940 in the US. It was not issued with the Rackham illustrations in the UK until 1950.
 The Folio Society 2006 edition featured 85 illustrations, 35 in colour, by Charles van Sandwyk. A fancier centenary edition was produced two years later.
 Michel Plessix created a Wind in the Willows watercolour comic album series, which helped to introduce the stories to France. They have been translated into English by Cinebook Ltd.
 Patrick Benson re-illustrated the story in 1994 and HarperCollins published it in 1994 together with the William Horwood sequels The Willows in Winter, Toad Triumphant and The Willows and Beyond. It was published in the US in 1995 by St. Martin's Press.
 Inga Moore's edition, abridged and illustrated by her, is arranged so that a featured line of the text also serves as a caption to a picture.
 Barnes & Noble Classics featured an introduction by Gardner McFall in 2007. New York, 
 Egmont Press produced a 100th Anniversary paperback edition, with Shepard's illustrations, in 2008. 
 Belknap Press, a division of Harvard University Press, published Seth Lerer's annotated edition in 2009.
 W. W. Norton published Annie Gauger's and Brian Jacques's annotated edition in 2009.
 Jamie Hendry Productions published a special edition of the novel in 2015 and donated it to schools in Plymouth and Salford to celebrate the World Premiere of the musical version of The Wind in the Willows by Julian Fellowes, George Stiles, and Anthony Drewe.
 IDW Publishing published an illustrated edition of the novel in 2016. The hardcover novel features illustrations from Eisner Award-winning artist David Petersen, who is best known for creating and drawing the comic series Mouse Guard.

Reception
A number of publishers rejected the manuscript. It was published in the UK by Methuen and Co., and later in the US by Scribner. The critics, who were hoping for a third volume in the style of Grahame's earlier works, The Golden Age and Dream Days, generally gave negative reviews. The public loved it, however, and within a few years it sold in such numbers that many reprints were required. In 1909, then US President Theodore Roosevelt wrote to Grahame to tell that he had "read it and reread it, and have come to accept the characters as old friends".

In The Enchanted Places, Christopher Robin Milne wrote of The Wind in the Willows:

Adaptations

Stage
 Toad of Toad Hall by A. A. Milne, produced in 1929 when the novel was in its 31st printing.
 Wind in the Willows, a 1985 Tony-nominated Broadway musical with book by Jane Iredale, lyrics by Roger McGough and music by William P. Perry, starring Nathan Lane
The Wind in the Willows by Alan Bennett, which premiered in December 1990 at the National Theatre in London.
Mr. Toad's Mad Adventures by Vera Morris
Wind in the Willows (UK National Tour) by Ian Billings
 The Wind in the Willows, two stage adaptations – a full musical adaptation and a small-scale, shorter, stage play version – by David Gooderson
 The Wind in the Willows, a musical theatre adaption by Scot Copeland and Paul Carrol Binkley.
 The Wind in the Willows by George Stiles, Anthony Drewe and Julian Fellowes which opened at Theatre Royal Plymouth in October 2016 before playing at The Lowry, Salford and then later playing at the London Palladium in the West End.
The Wind in the Willows (musical play) adapted by Michael Whitmore for Quantum Theatre, music by Gideon Escott, Lyrics by Jessica Selous  touring 2019
 The Wind in the Willows, opera for children in two acts by Elena Kats-Chernin (music) and Jens Luckwaldt (libretto, with English translation by Benjamin Gordon), commissioned by Staatstheater Kassel, world premiere 2 July 2021.
The Wind in the Willows (a musical in two acts) adapted by Andrew Gordon for Olympia Family Theater, music by Bruce Whitney, lyrics by Daven Tillinghast, Andrew Gordon, and Bruce Whitney, premiered 2012.

Theatrical films
 The Adventures of Ichabod and Mr. Toad, a 1949 animated adaptation produced by Walt Disney Productions for RKO Radio Pictures, narrated by Basil Rathbone. One half of the animated feature was based on the unrelated short story, The Legend of Sleepy Hollow.
 The Wind in the Willows, a 1996 live-action film written and directed by Terry Jones starring Steve Coogan as Mole, Eric Idle as Rat, and Jones as Mr. Toad.

Television
 Toad of Toad Hall, the first live action telecast of the novel. Adapted by Michael Barry for BBC Television and transmitted live in 1946. The film featured (in alphabetical order) Julia Braddock as Marigold, Kenneth More as Mr. Badger, Jack Newmark as Mole, Andrew Osborn as Water Rat, Jon Pertwee as the Judge, Alan Reid as Mr. Toad, John Thomas and Victor Woolf as Alfred the Horse, Madoline Thomas as Mother, and an uncredited  Pat Pleasanse as various rats, weasels, and mice.
 The Wind in the Willows, a 1969 TV series adaptation of the story produced by Anglia Television, told by still illustrations by artist John Worsley. The story was adapted, produced and narrated by Paul Honeyman and directed by John Salway.
 The Reluctant Dragon & Mr. Toad Show, a 1970–1971 TV series produced by Rankin/Bass Productions and animated overseas by Mushi Production in Tokyo, Japan, based on both The Reluctant Dragon and The Wind in the Willows.
 The Wind in the Willows, a 1983 animated TV film version with stop-motion animated puppets, produced by Cosgrove Hall Films.
 The Wind in the Willows, a 1984–1990 TV series following the 1983 film, using the same sets and characters in mostly original stories but also including some chapters from the book that were omitted in the film, notably "The Piper at the Gates of Dawn". The cast included David Jason, Sir Michael Hordern, Peter Sallis, Richard Pearson and Ian Carmichael. This series then had another TV movie made entitled A Tale of Two Toads and then a spin off series entitled Oh, Mr. Toad.
 The Wind in the Willows, a 1985/1987 animated musical TV film version for television, produced by Rankin/Bass Productions with animation by Wang Film Productions (also known as Cuckoo's Nest Studios) in Taiwan. This version was very faithful to the book and featured a number of original songs, including the title, "Wind in the Willows", performed by folk singer Judy Collins. Voice actors included Eddie Bracken as Mole, Jose Ferrer as Badger, Roddy McDowell as Ratty, and Charles Nelson Reilly as Toad.
 Wind in the Willows, a 1988 animated made-for-TV film by Burbank Films Australia and adapted by Leonard Lee.
 The Adventures of Mole, first part of a 1995 animated made-for-TV film produced by Martin Gates with a cast including Hugh Laurie as Toad, Richard Briers and Peter Davison as Ratty and Mole respectively and Paul Eddington as Badger. This part ends shortly after the visit to Badger at his home and the story is continued in The Adventures of Toad.
 The Wind in the Willows, a 1995 animated TV film adaptation narrated by Vanessa Redgrave (in the live action scenes) with a cast led by Michael Palin and Alan Bennett as Ratty and Mole, Rik Mayall as Toad and Michael Gambon as Badger; followed by an adaptation of The Willows in Winter produced by the now defunct TVC (Television Cartoons) in London.
 The Wind in the Willows, a 1999 Czech animated made-for-TV series.
 The Wind in the Willows, another live-action TV film in 2006 with Lee Ingleby as Mole, Mark Gatiss as Ratty, Matt Lucas as Toad, Bob Hoskins as Badger, and also featuring Imelda Staunton, Anna Maxwell Martin, Mary Walsh and Michael Murphy.

Unproduced
 In 2003, Guillermo del Toro was working on an adaptation for Disney. It was to mix live action with CG animation, and the director explained why he had to leave the helm. "It was a beautiful book, and then I went to meet with the executives and they said, 'Could you give Toad a skateboard and make him say, "radical dude" things?' and that's when I said, 'It's been a pleasure ...

Web series
 In 2014, Classic Alice took the titular character on a 6 episode reimagining of The Wind in the Willows. Reid Cox played Toad, and Kate Hackett and Tony Noto served as loose Badger/Ratty/Mole characters.

Radio
The BBC has broadcast a number of radio productions of the story. Dramatisations include:
 Eight episodes from 4 to 14 April 1955, BBC Home Service. With Richard Goolden, Frank Duncan, Olaf Pooley and Mary O'Farrell.
 Episodes from 27 September to 15 November 1965, BBC Home Service, with Leonard Maguire, David Steuart, and Douglas Murchie.
 Single 90 minute play, dramatised by A.A. Milne under the name Toad of Toad Hall, on 21 April 1973, BBC Radio 4, with Derek Smith, Bernard Cribbins, Richard Goolden, and Cyril Luckham.
 Six episodes from 28 April to 9 June 1983, BBC Schools Radio, Living Language series. With Paul Darrow as Badger.
 Six episodes, dramatised by John Scotney, from 13 February to 20 March 1994,  BBC Radio 5, with Martin Jarvis, Timothy Bateson, Willie Rushton, George Baker, and Dinsdale Landen.
 Single two-hour play, dramatised by Alan Bennett, on 27 August 1994, BBC Radio 4.

Abridged readings include:
 Ten-part reading by Alan Bennett from 31 July to 11 August 1989, BBC Radio 4.
 Twelve-part reading by Bernard Cribbins from 22 December 1983 to 6 January 1984, BBC channel unknown.
 Three-hour reading by June Whitfield, Nigel Anthony, James Saxon, and Nigel Lambert; Puffin audiobook, 1996.

Other presentation formats:
 Kenneth Williams did a version of the book for radio.
 In 2002 Paul Oakenfold produced a Trance Soundtrack for the story, aired on the Galaxy FM show Urban Soundtracks. These mixes blended classic stories with a mixture of dance and contemporary music.
 In 2013 Andrew Gordon produced a full-cast audio adaptation of his stage play, available on Audible and on CD.

Sequels and alternative versions
 Jan Needle's Wild Wood was published in 1981 with illustrations by William Rushton. It is a re-telling of the story of The Wind in the Willows from the point of view of the working-class inhabitants of the Wild Wood. For them, money is short and employment hard to find. They have a very different perspective on the wealthy, easy, careless lifestyle of Toad and his friends.
 In 1983 Dixon Scott published A Fresh Wind in the Willows.
 William Horwood created several sequels to The Wind in the Willows: The Willows in Winter, Toad Triumphant, The Willows and Beyond, and The Willows at Christmas (1999). These books include some of the same incidents as Scott's sequel, including a climax in which Toad steals a Bleriot monoplane.
 Jacqueline Kelly's sequel Return to the Willows was published in 2012.
 Kij Johnson published The River Bank in 2017. If Wild Wood reimagined Grahame's work through a shift of class, Johnson's work may be said to do the same thing through shift of gender.
 Daniel Mallory Ortberg included the story "Some of Us Had Been Threatening Our Friend Mr. Toad," which blends Wind in the Willows with the Donald Barthelme short story "Some of Us Had Been Threatening Our Friend Colby," in his 2018 collection The Merry Spinster: Tales of Everyday Horror. In Ortberg's retelling, Toad's friends are abusive and use the guise of "rescuing" their friend to justify violence and manipulation.
 Frederick Thurber's In the Wake of the Willows was published in 2019. It is the New World version of the original, recounting the adventures of the same set of characters, and their children, who lived on a coastal estuary in southern New England.
 Dina Gregory released an all-female adaptation on Audible in 2020. The story sticks very closely to the original, but with Lady Toad, Mistress Badger, Miss Water Rat and Mrs Mole.

Awards
 Mr. Toad was voted Number 38 among the 100 Best Characters in Fiction Since 1900 by Book magazine in their March/April 2002 issue.

Inspiration
Mapledurham House in Oxfordshire was an inspiration for Toad Hall, although Hardwick House and Fawley Court also make this claim.

The village of Lerryn in Cornwall claims to be the setting for the book.

Simon Winchester suggested that the character of Ratty was based on Frederick Furnivall, a keen oarsman and acquaintance of Grahame. However, Grahame himself said that this character was inspired by his good friend, the writer Sir Arthur Quiller-Couch. Grahame wrote this in a signed copy he gave to Quiller-Couch's daughter, Foy Felicia.

The Scotsman and Oban Times suggested  was inspired by the Crinan Canal, because Grahame spent some of his childhood in Ardrishaig.

There is a proposal that the idea for the story arose when its author saw a water vole beside the River Pang in Berkshire, southern England. A 29 hectare extension to the nature reserve at Moor Copse, near Tidmarsh Berkshire, was acquired in January 2007 by the Berkshire, Buckinghamshire and Oxfordshire Wildlife Trust.

Peter Ackroyd in his book, Thames: sacred river, asserts that "Quarry Wood, bordering on the river [Thames] at Cookham Dean, is the original of [the] 'Wild Wood' . . . ."

In popular culture

Music
 The first album by the psychedelic rock group Pink Floyd, The Piper at the Gates of Dawn (1967), was named by the founding member Syd Barrett after Chapter 7 of The Wind in the Willows. However, the songs on the album are not directly related to the contents of the book.
 Chapter 7 was the basis for the name and lyrics of "Piper at the Gates of Dawn", a song by the Irish singer-songwriter Van Morrison from his 1997 album The Healing Game.
 The song "The Wicker Man" by the British progressive metal band Iron Maiden also includes the phrase. 
 The British extreme metal band Cradle of Filth released a special edition of its album Thornography called Harder, Darker, Faster: Thornography Deluxe; on the song "Snake-Eyed and the Venomous", a pun is made in the lyrics "... all vipers at the gates of dawn" referring to Chapter 7 of the book.
 The song "Power Flower" on Stevie Wonder's 1979 album Stevie Wonder's Journey Through "The Secret Life of Plants", co-written with Michael Sembello, mentions "the piper at the gates of dawning".
 In 1991, Tower of Power included an instrumental entitled "Mr. Toad's Wild Ride" on the album Monster on a Leash.
 Wind in the Willows is a fantasy for flute, oboe, clarinet and bassoon, narrated by John Frith (2007).
 The Dutch composer Johan de Meij wrote a music piece for concert band in four movements, named after and based on The Wind in the Willows.
 The Edinburgh-based record label Song, by Toad Records takes its name from a passage in The Wind in the Willows.
 English composer John Rutter wrote a setting of The Wind in the Willows for narrator, SATB chorus and chamber orchestra.
 The American post-hardcore band La Dispute adapted the first chapter of the book into the song "Seven" on their EP Here, Hear II.

Adventure rides
 Mr. Toad's Wild Ride is the name of a ride at Disneyland in Anaheim, California, and a former attraction at Disney's Magic Kingdom in Orlando, Florida, inspired by Toad's motorcar adventure. It is the only ride with an alternative Latin title, given as the inscription on Toad's Hall: Toadi Acceleratio Semper Absurda ("Toad's Ever-Absurd Acceleration"). After the removal of the ride from the Magic Kingdom, a statue of Toad was added to the cemetery outside the Haunted Mansion attraction in the same park.

Other 
 In 2016, the historian Adrian Greenwood was tortured and murdered in his home by a thief intent on finding a rare 1908 first edition print of which he was in possession. The book was later recovered as part of the criminal investigation. The crime was the subject of a Channel 4 documentary entitled Catching a Killer: The Wind in the Willows Murder.
 In The Simpsons 1998 episode "Lisa Gets an 'A' (season 10, episode 7; AABF03), Lisa neglects to complete her Wind in the Willows reading homework and subsequently has to cheat on a pop-quiz.
 In Rugrats 1992 episode "The Santa Experience (season 2, episode 14; Chaz mentions that he had the lead role in a Wind in the Willows play in school when they were kids. Drew remarks that Chaz just played a tree.
In Downton Abbey, series 2, episode 2, the Dowager Countess learns that her granddaughter, Lady Edith Crowley, has volunteered to drive a tractor for a local farmer during the war, to which the Dowager Countess says, "You're a lady. Not Toad of Toad Hall!"

See also

References

Further reading
  tells how the stories evolved from bedtime stories (and letters, in his absence) for his son Alastair, then known as "Mouse".

External links

Online editions
 
  illustrated by Paul Bransom (1913)
 
  Adapted in 10 parts. Site also contains teaching resources and episode transcripts.
 

1908 British novels
1908 children's books
20th-century British children's literature
British children's novels
British novels adapted into films
Pan (god)
Culture associated with the River Thames
Fictional badgers
Books about frogs
Fictional mice and rats
Fictional moles
Fictional otters
Books about rabbits and hares
Fictional squirrels
Fictional weasels
Novels about friendship
Novels set in Berkshire
Novels set in England
Novels set in Oxfordshire
Books illustrated by E. H. Shepard
Books illustrated by Arthur Rackham
Methuen Publishing books
Works by Kenneth Grahame